Marbar (also Romanized as Mārbar and Mār Bor; also known as Mālbor, Mār Boz, and Mār Bur) is a village in Sardshir Rural District, in the Central District of Buin va Miandasht County, Isfahan Province, Iran. At the 2006 census, its population was 286, in 85 families.

References 

Populated places in Buin va Miandasht County